Planalto Serrano Regional Airport  is the airport serving Correia Pinto and Lages, Brazil.

It is operated by Infracea.

Airlines and destinations

Access

See also

List of airports in Brazil

References

External links

Airports in Santa Catarina (state)